Abhimanyu Rana (born 21 September 1991) is an Indian cricketer who plays for Himachal Pradesh. He made his List A debut on 21 February 2021, for Himachal Pradesh in the 2020–21 Vijay Hazare Trophy.

References

External links
 

1991 births
Living people
Indian cricketers
Himachal Pradesh cricketers
Cricketers from Delhi